Zhang Jun (born 15 August 1960) is a Chinese diplomat who has served as the Permanent Representative of China to the United Nations since July 30, 2019. From 2007 to 2012, he was the Ambassador Extraordinary and Plenipotentiary of the People's Republic of China to the Kingdom of the Netherlands, and Permanent Representative to the Organisation for the Prohibition of Chemical Weapons. In March 2020, he became President of the United Nations Security Council.

Biography
Zhang was born in Changchun, Jilin province in 1960. He earned a Bachelor of Laws from Jilin University in China and a Master of Laws in International Law from the University of Hull in the United Kingdom.

In August 2022, Zhang warned that Nancy Pelosi should not visit Taiwan, threatening "This visit is provocative, and if [Pelosi] insists on making it then China will take firm and strong measures to safeguard our national sovereignty and territorial integrity. We allow no one to cross this red line."

References

External links
Ambassador Zhang Jun, PR

1960 births
Ambassadors of China to the Netherlands
Living people
Permanent Representatives of the People's Republic of China to the United Nations
Jilin University alumni
Alumni of the University of Hull